Dear White People is an American comedy-drama television series on Netflix that follows several black college students at an Ivy League institution (the fictional Winchester University), touching on issues surrounding modern American race relations through a progressive lens. It is based on the 2014 film of the same name. The film's writer and director, Justin Simien, returned to write and direct episodes of the series. This series stars Logan Browning, Brandon P. Bell, DeRon Horton, and Antoinette Robertson. With a few exceptions, generally season finales, each episode focuses on one particular character. The series premiered on April 28, 2017. On October 2, 2019, the series was renewed for its fourth and final season, which was released on September 22, 2021.

Cast and characters

Main
 Logan Browning as Samantha White, a college student trying to wake people up to the social issues still at play at Winchester
 Brandon P. Bell as Troy Fairbanks; Bell reprises his role from the film
 DeRon Horton as Lionel Higgins, a highly intelligent school reporter with some emotional issues
 Antoinette Robertson as Colandrea "Coco" Conners, an ambitious black woman who antagonizes Samantha
 John Patrick Amedori as Gabe Mitchell, Samantha's main love interest
Ashley Blaine Featherson as Joelle Brooks; Featherson reprises her role from the film (the character is credited as "Curls" in the film)
 Marque Richardson as Reggie Green; Richardson reprises his role from the film (seasons 2-4; recurring season 1)
Jemar Michael as Al Lucas; Michael reprises his role from the film (the character is credited as "Smoothe" in the film) (season 4; recurring seasons 1-3)
Courtney Sauls as Brooke Morgan; Sauls reprises her role from the film (the character is credited as "Wild" in the film) (season 4; recurring seasons 1-3)

Recurring
 Giancarlo Esposito as Dr. Edward Ruskins / The Narrator, a former professor at Winchester who serves as the narrator for the first three seasons (seasons 1-3)
 DJ Blickenstaff as Silvio, Lionel's love interest (seasons 1-3)
 Caitlin Carver as Muffy Tuttle
 Ally Maki as Ikumi (seasons 1, 3)
 Obba Babatundé as Dean Fairbanks
 Brandon Black as Pastor Kordell
 Wyatt Nash as Kurt Fletcher (seasons 1-3) 
 Erich Lane as Clifton
 Sheridan Pierce as Abigail
 Nicholas Anthony Reid as James
 John Rubinstein as President Fletcher, Kurt's father (seasons 1, 4)
 Nia Long as Neika Hobbs (season 1) 
 Nia Jervier as Kelsey Phillips; Jervier reprises her role from the film (the character is credited as "Coco's Friend" in the film) (seasons 1-3)
 Jeremy Tardy as Rashid Mburu (seasons 1-3)
 Francia Raisa as Vanessa (season 1)
 Dahéli Hall as Dereca
 Alex Alcheh as Milo (seasons 1, 3)
 Lena Waithe as P. Ninny; Waithe was a producer for the film (season 2)
 Blair Underwood as Moses Brown (Season 3)
 Quei Tann as Genifer (seasons 3-4)<ref>{{cite web|last1=Henderson|first1=Taylor|title=Dear White People' Breaks New Ground in Black LGBTQ Representation'|url=https://www.pride.com/tv/2019/8/08/dear-white-people-breaks-new-ground-black-lgbtq-representation#media-gallery-media-1|website=Pride|language=en-US|date=August 8, 2019|access-date=December 6, 2020|archive-date=September 10, 2020|archive-url=https://web.archive.org/web/20200910082909/https://www.pride.com/tv/2019/8/08/dear-white-people-breaks-new-ground-black-lgbtq-representation#media-gallery-media-1|url-status=live}}</ref> 
 Wade F. Wilson as Michael (seasons 3-4)
 Joi Liaye as Iesha Vital (season 4)
 Judith Scott as Helen Freeman (season 4)
 Rome Flynn as David (season 4)
 Wendie Malick as Geraldine Bernadette (season 4)

Guest
 Brant Daugherty as Thane Lockwood 
 Tessa Thompson as Rikki Carter. (Thompson originally played Samantha White in the film.)
 Tyler James Williams as Carson Rhodes. (Williams originally played Lionel Higgins in the film.)
 Brandon Alter as George; Alter reprises his role from the film
 Wendy Raquel Robinson as Tina White

Episodes
Series overview

Volume 1 (2017)
{{Episode table |background=#EFCC52|overall=5 |season=5 |title=30 |director=15 |writer=20 |aux2=10 |airdate=15 |aux2T=Featured character(s) |released=y |episodes=

{{Episode list
| EpisodeNumber = 3
| EpisodeNumber2 = 3
| Title = Chapter III
| DirectedBy = Tina Mabry
| WrittenBy = Chuck Hayward
| OriginalAirDate = 
| Aux2 = Troy
| ShortSummary = Troy Fairbanks, son of the Dean, is running for student body president. While Troy is at a donors party, Lionel texts him about the Dear Black People party. Seeing this, Troy has the campus police peacefully shut it down. Troy brings Lionel along to see his campaign trail, and Kurt (Pastiche's editor) asks Troy for help to get people to stop hating him, but is brushed off. After Troy spends the night with Professor Neika Hobbs, come morning he won the election. At his dorm, Troy receives blackmail from Kurt, forcing his hand. Meanwhile, star running back Thane Lockwood dies at a party.
| LineColor = #EFCC52
}}

}}

Volume 2 (2018)

Volume 3 (2019)

Volume 4 (2021)

Production
Netflix initially ordered ten 30-minute episodes from Simien and Lionsgate, which distributed the film. TV writer Yvette Lee Bowser, creator of Living Single, joined the series as showrunner and executive producer. The first season was released on April 28, 2017. On June 30, 2017, Netflix renewed the series for a second season, which premiered on May 4, 2018. On June 21, 2018, the series was renewed for a third season, which was released on August 2, 2019. On October 2, 2019, the series was renewed for a fourth and final season. Simien promoted longtime series writer Jaclyn Moore to co-showrunner for this concluding chapter, which features a significant musical element. The final season was released on September 22, 2021.

Reception
The initial trailer for the TV show attracted some angry responses, with the series being accused by some Twitter users of being racist towards white people; they called for a boycott of Netflix. The YouTube trailer for the series received more dislikes than likes.Andrew Filfield: Netflix's Dear White People inspires yet another #Boycott . Metronews (Canada), February 13, 2017 Series creator Justin Simien responded positively to the backlash, saying it reiterated the point of the series and brought more attention to it as well. Lead actress Logan Browning noted that many of the critics who gave the show rave reviews were white.

Actor Jeremy Tardy announced he would not be returning for the fourth season, citing racism allegations against Lionsgate. Specifically, Tardy and fellow actors were presented unequal pay and negotiation powers for their fourth-season roles.

Critical response
The series has been met with critical acclaim. On Rotten Tomatoes, season one has a "Certified Fresh" 95% approval rating based on 55 reviews from critics, with an average rating of 8.69/10. The website's critics consensus reads, "Timely, provocative, and sharply written, Dear White People is an entertaining blend of social commentary and incisive humor." On Metacritic, the season has a weighted average score of 85 out of 100, based on 21 reviews, indicating "universal acclaim". Peter Debruge, writing for Variety, praised the show's writing, directing, social commentary, and cast. The New York Times praised the show's examination of concerns such as appropriation, assimilation, and conflict.

On Rotten Tomatoes, season two holds an approval rating of 100% based on 32 reviews from critics, with an average rating of 9.35/10. The website's critics consensus reads, "Dear White Peoples endearing excellence returns, but with an added layer of emotional maturity that enhances the show's powerful, relevant meditations on race relations in America." On Metacritic, the second season has a score of 89 out of 100, based on 7 reviews, indicating "universal acclaim".

The third season has a 90% approval rating on Rotten Tomatoes, based on 20 reviews, with an average rating of 8/10. The website's critics consensus states, "Though at times it vamps more than it grows, Dear White People'' third season still excels thanks to its continued willingness to confront tough social issues with comedic grace." On Metacritic, the third season has a score of 78 out of 100, based on 8 critics, indicating "generally favorable reviews".

Accolades

References

External links
 
 
 

2010s American LGBT-related drama television series
2010s American LGBT-related comedy television series
2010s American black television series
2010s American college television series
2010s American comedy-drama television series
2010s American satirical television series
2017 American television series debuts
2020s American LGBT-related drama television series
2020s American LGBT-related comedy television series
2020s American black television series
2020s American college television series
2020s American comedy-drama television series
2020s American satirical television series
2021 American television series endings
Lesbian-related television shows
Gay-related television shows
English-language Netflix original programming
Live action television shows based on films
Television series by Lionsgate Television
Works about higher education
Television series about radio
Television shows directed by Justin Tipping
Television controversies in the United States
Race-related controversies in television